The 13th Parliament of Singapore was a meeting of the Parliament of Singapore. The first session commenced on 15 January 2016 and was dissolved on 23 June 2020. The membership was set by the 2015 Singapore General Election on 11 September 2015, and changed twice throughout the term; one was the resignation of Bukit Batok Single Member Constituency MP David Ong in 2016, and the resignation of Marsiling–Yew Tee Group Representation Constituency MP and Speaker Halimah Yacob in 2017.

The 13th Parliament is controlled by a People's Action Party majority, led by Prime Minister Lee Hsien Loong and members of the cabinet, which assumed power on 1 October 2015. The Opposition is led by the Secretary General of the Workers' Party, Pritam Singh. Tan Chuan-Jin, of the People's Action Party, is the Speaker of Parliament as of 11 September 2017. He succeeds Yacob, who resigned as Speaker to contest in the Presidential Elections 2017. Yacob was previously elected as the 9th Speaker of the House during the 12th Parliament on 14 January 2013.

Result of the 2015 Singapore general election

The Workers' Party, being the best performing opposition parties were awarded three Non-Constituency Member of Parliament seats in accordance with the Constitution. Lee Li Lian, Dennis Tan, and Leon Perera were appointed as NCMPs, though Lee Li Lian decided not to accept the NCMP post.

Officeholders

Speaker 
Halimah Yacob of the People's Action Party, MP of Marsiling–Yew Tee GRC, was re-elected as Speaker of Parliament on 15 January 2016. She relinquished her post on 7 August 2017 to run for the presidency in the 2017 Singapore presidential election, with Charles serving as Acting Speaker until 10 September 2017.
Charles Chong and Lim Biow Chuan of the People's Action Party were elected as Deputy Speakers on 25 January 2016
Tan Chuan-Jin was elected as Speaker and becomes the 10th Speaker of the Republic of Singapore on 11 September 2017.

Leaders
Prime Minister: Lee Hsien Loong (People's Action Party)
Leader of the Opposition: Pritam Singh (Workers' Party)

House Leaders
Leader of the House: Grace Fu
Deputy Leader of the House: Desmond Lee

Whips
Government Whip: Janil Puthucheary
Deputy Government Whip: Sim Ann and Zaqy Mohamad

Committees

Select committees

Committee of selection
Chaired by Speaker of Parliament Tan Chuan-Jin, the committee of selection selects and nominates members to the various sessional and select committees. The committee consisted of seven other members:
Chan Chun Sing
Cedric Foo
Grace Fu
Indranee Rajah
Masagos Zulkifli
Ong Ye Kung
Pritam Singh

Committee of privileges
The committee of privileges looks into any complaint alleging breaches of parliamentary privilege. Chaired by Speaker of Parliament Tan Chuan-Jin, the committee consisted of seven other members:
Chen Show Mao
Grace Fu
Indranee Rajah
Maliki Osman
Seah Kian Peng
K. Shanmugam
Edwin Tong

Estimates committee
The estimates committee examines the Government's budget and reports what economies, improvements in organisation, efficiency or administrative reforms consistent with the policy underlying the estimates, may be effected and suggests the form in which the estimates shall be presented to Parliament. The committee consisted of eight members:
Foo Mee Har (Chairperson)
Chia Shi-Lu
Cheng Li Hui
Darryl David
Christopher de Souza
Daniel Goh
Lee Yi Shyan
Alex Yam

House committee
The house committee looks after the comfort and convenience of Members of Parliament and advises the Speaker on these matters. Chaired by Speaker of Parliament Tan Chuan-Jin, the committee consisted of seven other members:
Amrin Amin
Gan Thiam Poh
Henry Kwek
Low Yen Ling
Faisal Manap
Sun Xueling
Yee Chia Hsing

Public accounts committee
The public accounts committee examines various accounts of the Government showing the appropriation of funds granted by Parliament to meet public expenditure, as well as other accounts laid before Parliament. The committee consisted of eight members:
Jessica Tan (Chairperson)
Ang Hin Kee
Ang Wei Neng
Liang Eng Hwa
Lim Wee Kiak
Leon Perera
Tin Pei Ling
Zainal Sapari

Public petitions committee
The public petitions committee deals with public petitions received by the House. Its function is to consider petitions referred to the Committee and to report to the House. Chaired by Speaker of Parliament Tan Chuan-Jin, the committee consisted of seven other members:
Cheryl Chan
Janil Puthucheary
Desmond Lee
Louis Ng
Denise Phua
Dennis Tan
Melvin Yong

Standing orders committee
The standing orders committee reviews the Standing Orders from time to time and recommends amendments and reports to the House on all matters relating to them. Chaired by Speaker of Parliament Tan Chuan-Jin, the committee consisted of nine other members:
Charles Chong (Deputy Speaker)
Lim Biow Chuan (Deputy Speaker)
Chan Chun Sing
Desmond Choo
Grace Fu
Joan Pereira
Png Eng Huat
Rahayu Mahzam
Patrick Tay

Government Parliamentary Committees
Mooted by then-Prime Minister Goh Chok Tong in 1987, government parliamentary committees (GPCs) are set up by the governing People's Action Party to scrutinise the legislation and programmes of the various Ministries. They also serve as an additional channel of feedback on government policies.

Members

References

Parliament of Singapore